I'm Right Here is the debut studio extended play by American singer-songwriter, rapper and musician Chris Rene released on October 2, 2012 through Syco and Epic Records. This is Rene's first major label project, and second studio work overall, after he released his 2009 independent studio album, Soul'd Out. Rene, a third-place finalist from the inaugural season of the U.S. version of The X Factor, was signed to Epic by his mentor, L.A. Reid. Rene began production on his album in December 2011, and completed recording by June 2012. The record boasts assistance on writing and productions from Alex Lambert, Brandyn Burnette, busbee, Christian Rich, Chuck Harmony, Claude Kelly, J. Bonilla, J.R. Rotem, Jon Levine, Lauren Evans, Marlin "Hookman" Bonds, Marty James, Mitchum Chin, Peter Biker, Supa Dups and Talay Riley, along with compositions from Rene's brother and sister, Gabriel and Gina.

The album debuted at #55 on the Billboard 200 charts, selling around 9,000 units in its first week. It dropped off the chart after just two weeks and has sold over 22,000 copies as of 2013. Young Homie was issued as the official first single from the album in March 2012. Though the song failed to chart on the U.S. Billboard Hot 100, it did land at #1 on both the New Zealand chart and the U.S. Billboard Bubbling Under Hot 100, #26 on the U.S. Top 40 Pop chart, #72 on the Canadian Hot 100 chart and is certified platinum in New Zealand. The single also sold 293,000 units in digital download sales in the U.S., according to Nielsen Soundscan. The second official single released from the album is the reggae-tinged pop song Trouble. The single debuted at 100 on the US Hot 100 Airplay charts and is certified gold in New Zealand.

Development

Chris Rene's journey began in June 2011 when he auditioned for the debut season of the US version of The X Factor. By then, Rene was just 70 days clean and sober, fresh out of a Santa Cruz rehabilitation center from a drug and alcohol addiction. Rene ultimately finished the season in third place, behind runner-up Josh Krajcik and winner Melanie Amaro, though Rene proved to be a memorable and influential figure from the show. Rene, along with season one The X Factor winner Melanie Amaro, and fellow finalists Marcus Canty and Astro, were signed to mentor L.A. Reid's revamped label Epic Records in December 2011, a day after the X-Factor finale. Rene's contract would reportedly be worth $150,000 to $500,000 with the label, which stands to reason since he finished in third place.

Rene immediately entered the studio in Los Angeles with writer Marty James and producer J.R. Rotem to rework his popular song, "Young Homie", to be released as his official first single under the label.  Over the next few months, Rene would travel between California and New York to record his new project, with assistance on writing and production from heavyweights Claude Kelly, Matthew "Boi-1da" Samuels, Carsten "Soulshock" Schack, Dwayne "Supa Dups" Chin-Quee, Livvi Franc, Ali Tamposi, Chuck Harmony, Jon Jon Traxx, Christian Rich, busbee, J Bonilla, American Idol semi-finalist Alex Lambert and more.

Composition
Chris Rene's musical style is described as both "current and easily identifiable." Rene draws his influences from rock 'n' roll, reggae, blues, punk and rap, and is inspired by artists such as Stevie Wonder, Bob Marley, Billy Joel, Kanye West, Eric Clapton, Rihanna, Elton John, Bone Thugs-n-Harmony, Eminem, Led Zeppelin and more. Chris uses a vocal blend of rapping and singing, which he calls "ringing," a term coined by his sister Gina Rene.  Rene confirms that the album, sonically, will sound diverse. "[T]here's a little of everything; you got pop songs, rap songs, a mixture of rap-singing, rapping...". The album features themes such as love, women, overcoming obstacles and spreading a positive message through his motto, "love life."

Release and promotion
I'm Right Here was released on October 2, 2012 through Epic Records and Syco Music in physical and digital download formats. It debuted at number 55 on the Billboard 200. Fans who pre-ordered the album on iTunes, Amazon or Walmart were treated to exclusive bonus contents: the bonus track "Tidal Wave" if ordered on iTunes, the bonus track "I Made It" if ordered on Amazon, and an autographed booklet if ordered on Walmart. Rene has promoted singles and the album with appearances on The Ellen DeGeneres Show, Vh1's Big Morning Buzz Live, Anderson Live and the Ricki Lake Show. Rene embarked on a U.S. radio promotional tour, concert appearances with Austin Mahone, Sean Kingston, Cher Lloyd, Karmin, Flo Rida, Cody Simpson, The Wanted, Carly Rae Jepsen, Maroon 5 and more.

"Young Homie" was released as the album's lead single on March 13, 2012. Rene previewed a first listen to fans online via SoundCloud on February 23. An accompanying music video followed the release on March 20, 2012. The video was directed by Jeremy Rall and premiered on VEVO. Though the song failed to chart on the U.S. Billboard Hot 100, it did land at #1 on both the New Zealand chart and the U.S. Billboard Bubbling Under Hot 100, #26 on the U.S. Top 40 Pop chart, #72 on the Canadian Hot 100 chart and is certified platinum in New Zealand. The single also sold 261,000 units in digital download sales in the U.S., according to Nielsen Soundscan. "Trouble" was released as the album's second official single. It impacted radio stations June 26, 2012. The music video, which features model Tyri Rudolph as Rene's leading lady, premiered on VEVO August 13, 2012. The single debuted at #100 on the Billboard Hot 100 Airplay charts. It is also certified gold in New Zealand. The song has sold 51,000 units in digital download sales in the U.S. to date, according to Nielsen Soundscan.

Track listing

(*) Denotes co-producer
Sample credits
"Young Homie" contains a sample of "I Like Funky Music" composed by Walter Murphy and Gene Pastilli.

Credits and personnel
Credits for I'm Right Here adapted from AllMusic.

Anzo – engineer
Victoria Aronson – grooming
Stellina Bickers – A&R
Peter Biker – arranger, composer, instrumentation, producer
Marlin "Hookman" Bonds – composer
J. Bonilla – composer, producer, programming
Anita Marisa Boriboon – art direction
Delbert Bowers – assistant
Brandyn Burnette – background vocals, composer
Busbee – bass, background vocals, composer, engineer, instrumentation, piano, producer, programming, strings, ukulele
Ben Chang – engineer
Mitchum Chin – composer, producer
Chin-Quee – composer
Lauren Evans – composer
Mike Flynn – A&R
Chris Gellard – assistant
Chuck Harmony – composer, producer
Trehy Harris – assistant
Marty James – composer
Jaycen Joshua – mixing

JP Robinson – creative director
Claude Kelly – background vocals, composer, producer, vocal producer
Gelly Kusuna – engineer
Dave Kutch – mastering
Tyson Kuteyl – mixing
Alex Lambert – background vocals, composer
Jon Levine – composer, engineer, producer, programming
Manny Marroquin – mixing
Conrad Martin – production coordination
Morgan O'Malley – A&R
Dwayne "Supa Dups" Chin Quee – producer
Chris Rene – composer, primary artists, vocals (background)
Gabriel Rene – composer
Gina Rene – composer
April Roomet – stylist
Carsten "Mintman" Mortensen – add. Keyboard
J.R. Rotem – producer
Carsten Schack – composer
Soulshock – arranger, instrumentation, mixing, producer
Carlos Taylor – production coordinator

Release history

References

External links
 

2012 EPs
Albums produced by busbee
Albums produced by Chuck Harmony
Albums produced by J. R. Rotem
Albums produced by Supa Dups
Chris Rene albums
Epic Records albums
Albums produced by Jon Levine